Holy Trinity Episcopal Church is a historic church at the junction of Monmouth and Third Avenues in Spring Lake, Monmouth County, New Jersey, United States.

It was built in 1880 and added to the National Register of Historic Places in 1991.

The church houses a fully functional 1904 Bates & Culley pipe organ.

References

External links

Episcopal church buildings in New Jersey
Churches on the National Register of Historic Places in New Jersey
Gothic Revival church buildings in New Jersey
Churches completed in 1880
19th-century Episcopal church buildings
Churches in Monmouth County, New Jersey
National Register of Historic Places in Monmouth County, New Jersey
New Jersey Register of Historic Places
Spring Lake, New Jersey